The Continental O-300 and the C145 are a family of air-cooled flat-6 aircraft piston engines built by Teledyne Continental Motors.

First produced in 1947, versions were still in production . It was produced under licence in the United Kingdom by Rolls-Royce in the 1960s.

Development
 
The C-145 was developed from the  C-125 engine. Both powerplants share the same crankcase, although the C-145 produces an additional  through a longer piston stroke, higher compression ratio of 7.0:1 and different carburetor jetting.

The O-300 is a modernized C-145 and retains the same weight, dimensions, bore, stroke, compression ratio, displacement and output power of the earlier engine.

GO-300

The GO-300 employs a reduction gearbox, so that the engine turns at 3200 rpm to produce a propeller rpm of 2400.  The GO-300 produces  whereas the ungeared O-300 produces .

The GO-300 engine has a TBO (Time Between Overhaul) of 1200 hours, while 1800 hours is the standard for ungeared O-300 engines. The GO-300 engine suffered reliability problems as a result of pilots mishandling the engine and operating it at too low an engine rpm. This caused the Cessna Skylark to develop a poor reputation for engine reliability. Many Skylarks flying today have been converted to different, larger-displacement, direct-drive engines.

Variants
C145
Six-cylinder, direct-drive engine.
C145-2
O-300
Modernized C145, direct drive engine.
O-300-A

O-300-B

O-300-C

O-300-D

O-300-E
Limited production for the Beagle B.218X twin that never went into production
GO-300
Geared O-300,  at 3200 crankshaft rpm, 2400 propeller rpm.
GO-300-A

GO-300-C

GO-300-D

Voyager 300
Liquid-cooled, fuel-injected version developing  at 2,700 rpm.
Rolls-Royce-Continental O-300Licence production in the United Kingdom.

Applications

O-300
 Aeronca Sedan
 Baumann Brigadier
 Cessna 160 - intended for production model
 Cessna 170
 Cessna 172 and T-41 Mescalero
 Maule M-4
 Meyers MAC-145
 Taylorcraft 15
 Temco TE-1A

GO-300
 Cessna 175
 Goodyear GZ-19 and GZ-19A

Voyager 300
 Alexeev Strizh

Specifications (O-300)
Reference: Engines for Homebuilt Aircraft & Ultralights

See also

References

Boxer engines
1940s aircraft piston engines
O-300